The 1963 South African Grand Prix, formally titled the 10th International RAC Grand Prix of South Africa, was a Formula One motor race held at East London on 28 December 1963. It was the tenth and final race in both the 1963 World Championship of Drivers and the 1963 International Cup for Formula One Manufacturers. The 85-lap race was won from pole position by Jim Clark in a works Lotus-Climax, the Scottish driver achieving his seventh win of the 1963 Championship. Dan Gurney finished second in a Brabham-Climax, while Graham Hill was third in a BRM. It would be the last Formula One race in December until the 2019 Abu Dhabi Grand Prix.

Classification

Qualifying

Race

Championship standings after the race

Drivers' Championship standings

Constructors' Championship standings

 Notes: Only the top five positions are included for both sets of standings. Only the best 6 results counted towards the Championship. Numbers without parentheses are Championship points; numbers in parentheses are total points scored.

References

South African Grand Prix
Grand Prix
East London, Eastern Cape
South African Grand Prix
December 1963 sports events in Africa